TV6 was a French private and free national television channel dedicated to music and youth, created on March 1, 1986. One year later to the day, it was also the first to die live in the history of French television, on Saturday, February 28, 1987, at midnight (five years before La Cinq), a clear stop for political reasons following the parliamentary elections in the spring of 1986, which were lost by the majority and won by the opposition represented by Jacques Chirac. The new government (the first cohabiting government) had decided to undo the audiovisual achievements and projects of its predecessors (and political opponents) and in particular to reallocate the sixth channel to Métropole Télévision, thus leaving TV6 very little time to build its programs and demonstrate its audience progress.

A few hours after TV6's definitive disappearance, on Sunday, March 1, 1987, M6 broadcast its first live broadcasts.

Despite a short broadcast period, TV6 has left its mark on the television genre with personalities such as Jean-Luc Delarue, Childéric Muller and Alain Maneval and a new tone, inventing the "free antenna" and music TV. TV6 has left a strong imprint on a whole generation.

History of the channel 
In November 1984, Léo Scheer, who designed and developed Canal+, left Havas and André Rousselet to join Publicis and Maurice Levy to implement a new commercial television project in partnership with Europe 1 Communications.

In 1985, a little over a year before the parliamentary elections in France, the ruling left feared failure and wanted to create a new space, outside the institutional domain of public television, that would reach a large audience (unlike Canal+ encrypted) and provide an opinion relay for its ideas if it were to return to the opposition. The President of the Republic, François Mitterrand, then launched the idea of "an additional space of freedom" in a television interview on 16 January and asked Laurent Fabius' government to study the project. Lawyer Jean-Denis Bredin, commissioned by the Prime Minister to write a report on the opening of the "television space to private television", presented it to him on May 20. It recommended the creation of two national private free-to-air television channels financed by advertising and whose frequencies would be granted by the State in accordance with Article 79 of the Law of 29 July 1982 on audiovisual communication. On 31 July, Georges Fillioud, French Minister of State for Communication Techniques, presented a communication on the development of the audiovisual sector to the Council of Ministers. He announced a bill defining the creation by the spring of 1986 of two new private television channels with national broadcasting, one generalist, the other with a musical vocation, as well as local television channels, in the capital of which would be press groups, production, and advertising companies. Under the guise of an open audiovisual landscape, the choice of formats betrayed the political ulterior motives of the government project, with the generalist channel being able to become an excellent opinion relay for the entire population in the event of electoral defeat, and the music channel a relay more specifically geared towards young people, an important source of voice for the Socialist Party.

Following the government's decision to create two new private national television channels and no longer just one, Léo Scheer and the producer of Les Enfants du Rock, Jean-Martial Lefranc, were developing, under the direction of Maurice Lévy, the project for a television channel adapted to a new wireless network, targeted at young people. Publicis, the largest advertising agency in Europe, then changed partners for its commercial television project and joined forces with the leaders in communication and the music industry such as NRJ, Gaumont, the Gilbert Gross communication agency and the three music publishing majors, Polygram, Sony and Virgin. This group, which in its form met the conditions laid down by the government's draft law, submitted its application for a public service concession contract to the High Authority for Audiovisual Communication. The project was simply called TV6, after almost being called TNT, Turbo 6, V 6, MV 6, Super 6 or NRJ 6.

Three projects were competing for the award of the sixth network concession: CLT, the unsuccessful candidate for the fifth channel, which was still seeking to establish RTL Television in France, the Publicis/Gaumont/NRJ/Gilbert Gross consortium, and the Hit FM/RSCG consortium led by the incumbent's favourite advertiser, Jacques Séguéla. On 28 January 1986, the government chose TV6, a company led by Publicis, to create the first French television channel devoted to youth and music. The 18-year public service concession contract between the State and TV6 was signed on the same day and the decree approving the contract and the specifications of the sixth channel was published on 21 February. The channel was required to devote at least 50% of its broadcasting time to music and, contrary to the specifications of La Cinq, was subject to the same obligations as public channels for the time between theatrical release and film screening and the quotas for broadcasting French films. It was also required to broadcast 350 hours of its own productions in the first year and produce 100 video clips.

After the looping of a trailer on 22 February 1986 on TDF's new sixth terrestrial network, TV6, France's leading music television channel, began broadcasting on Saturday 1 March 1986 at 14:00. Faithful to its target audience, it called itself the youngest TV channel and devoted itself entirely to contemporary music. Each of the project's partners contributed to the project: Gaumont brought its catalog of films and television series, NRJ its animators and musical know-how and Publicis taking charge of the channel's management and advertising management. As a private commercial channel, TV6 would broadcast two minutes of advertising every twenty minutes.

Following the parliamentary elections of March 1986, the right returned to power. Jacques Chirac was Prime Minister and asked his new Minister of Communication, François Léotard, to implement the government's audiovisual policy: privatisation of TF1 and cancellation of the concessions of the two new private channels, La Cinq and TV6, which were too quickly awarded on pressure from the Élysée without a real call for tenders. By Decree No. 86-901 of 30 July 1986, Jacques Chirac's government decided to reallocate this channel before the end of its concession. Following an appeal by TV6, this decree was annulled by the decision of the Conseil d'État on 2 February 1987, because the Minister had not respected the legal deadline of the one-year concession. However, on 15 January 1987, the Commission nationale de la communication et des libertés (CNCL), which succeeded the Haute Autorité de la communication audiovisuelle on 30 September 1986, set out the general and specific obligations of "private national free-to-air terrestrial television" in Decisions No. 87-1 and 87–2. On 2 February 1987, Decree No. 87-51 terminated the concession contract for the sixth channel, which ended at midnight on 28 February 1987 and at the same time opened the call for applications for the reallocation of the network. The CNCL was hearing the Métropole Télévision project presented by Lyonnaise des Eaux in partnership with CLT, the producer Marin Karmitz (MK2) and the press group Amaury, the Télé Fiction Musique group, as well as TV6, candidate for its own succession.

To thwart the project Métropole Télévision de la Lyonnaise des Eaux and CLT, which was favored by the government (Jacques Chirac having already promised the sixth channel to his friend Jérôme Monod, CEO of Lyonnaise des Eaux, as well as to CLT against an agreement on the Luxembourg vote on the common agricultural policy), Publicis then negotiated with Lyonnaise des Eaux to make a new round table involving both new and old operators, as Silvio Berlusconi had done a few days earlier with Robert Hersant for La Cinq. However, the negotiations did not succeed and on February 25 and 26, 1987, the CNCL allocated the sixth network to Métropole Télévision. Serge Gainsbourg, Johnny Hallyday, Eddy Mitchell and other personalities, called on the government in vain to try to save TV6.

On February 28, 1987, TV6's headquarters, whose one-year concession had not been renewed, was stormed by young television viewers who invaded the Champs-Élysées and improvised a demonstration with the artists (Francis Lalanne, Marc Lavoine, Mylène Farmer, Patrick Bruel, etc.). Fifteen thousand over-excited teenagers went up the avenue to the Star. Childéric Muller, the star of the chain, had to climb a tree with a megaphone to disperse the crowd at the end of the demonstration. In the evening, TV6 broadcast its latest show from the set of the Tam-Tam show installed at VCF in Saint-Cloud in the presence of many artists and all the channel's hosts (Smicky, Jean-Luc Delarue, Isabelle Duhamel, Frédéric Smektala, Frédéric de Rieux, Childeric Muller and Alain Maneval who carried a sign with the words "y'en a qu'une, c'est la 6" (a reference to TF1's slogan at that time)). The programme ended with a Star Wars parody clip in which Darth Vader (symbolizing the new right-wing government Chirac/Balladur) congratulates himself on the victory of the Empire (the Lyonnaise des Eaux/CLT group) over the rebellion (TV6 owned by Publicis/NRJ) and explodes the TV6 planet. The next day, March 1, 1987, M6 took over at 11:15 a.m., on the same frequencies where its late competitor had turned off its transmitters at midnight.

Benefiting from a network of transmitters mainly located in the major urban basins of France, M6 would nevertheless have to retain in its programming a certain musical dominance, inherited from TV6.

Organization

Executives 

President
Maurice Lévy

General director 
Léo Scheer (Designer and operational manager of TV6)

Deputy general director
Jean-Martial Lefranc

Director of programming 
Patrice Blanc-Francard

Capital 
TV6's share capital was FRF 10,000,000,000, 25% held by Publicis, 25% by Gaumont, 18% by NRJ, 12% by Gilbert Gross, and the remaining 20% being divided between management, private individuals and the 'three majors' of music publishing: Polygram, Sony and Virgin.

Headquarters 
TV6's registered office was located at 133 avenue des Champs-Elysées in the 8th arrondissement of Paris, the headquarters of its main shareholder Publicis.

Programming 
From March to September 1986, TV6 opened its antenna every day at 2 p.m. and broadcast until midnight a schedule containing only music programs. From October 25, 1986, TV6 began broadcasting television series and a soap opera, as well as films, mainly from the Gaumont catalog and selected by Gérard Jourd'hui. TV6 tried to differentiate itself from its competitors by the editorial choice made for films and series that could not be seen elsewhere.

Dominique Duforest was in charge of selecting the video clips and their programming and on-air packaging. The musical jingles were made by producer-arranger Jean-Pierre Castelain.

Program grids 

TV series are marked in green; TV movies in pink; shows in golden brown and movies in brown. The ® corresponds to the reruns. The first one is for March 1986; the second one was used from October 1986 to February 1987.

 "The youngest of all TV channels": this slogan referred to the target audience of the channel, the young people, and the fact that it was the latest television channel in France.

Animators 

 Jacques Colin
 Cookie
 Alain Maneval
 Bintou Simpore
 Childeric Muller
 Dominique Duforest
 Frédéric Derieux
 Frédéric Smektala
 Francis Zégut
 Isabelle Duhamel
 Jean-Luc Delarue
 Olivier Dorangeon
 Philippe Vandel
 Smicky

Diffusion 
TV6 was broadcast on TDF's new sixth analog terrestrial network, which, at its creation, reached only 7,600,000 viewers with 9 low-power transmitters broadcasting to major cities. As broadcasts were retransmitted in SECAM with "line identification" to facilitate the transmission of new TV services of the time (Teletext, VPS, etc.), several households had to change antennas (Broadband) or TV receivers as a result of incompatibilities with the historical SECAM "frame identification" format (SECAM bottles (archive)) resulting in a black and white image on the stations concerned. These technical developments were to some extent an obstacle to the deployment of the sixth channel network in the country. As a private channel, TV6 had to finance the new transmitters installed by TDF, with the help of some local authorities wishing to meet the expectations of their citizens.

TV6 was also relayed throughout France via the Telecom 1B satellite, which, thanks to La Cinq, would promote the deployment of parabolic equipment in France.

Audience 
In 1987, TV6 reached more than ten million households (covering the Île-de-France, Lyon and Marseille regions). However, its launch was compromised due to technical difficulties in receiving it (TV channels less powerful than those of TF1, Antenne 2, FR3, Canal+, and La Cinq). Due to the absence of a reliable audience measurement concerning it at the time (the audience rating did not concern La Cinq or TV6), the press and the media had treated it as marginal. Finally, the powerful cable television lobby (Lyonnaise des Eaux, Compagnie générale des eaux, France Télécom), seeing in it a national thematic channel likely to hinder its development, did everything to minimize its success. From the beginning, the channel had a daily audience of 500,000 viewers, representing 0.3% of the audience, mainly teenagers. After a year of broadcasts, more than 14 million French people knew TV6.

See also
 Publicis
 Gaumont
 NRJ Group
 Virgin
 NRJ 12
 M6

References 

Companies disestablished in 1987
Television channels and stations disestablished in 1987
Defunct television channels in France
Publicis Groupe
Defunct companies of France
Television channels and stations established in 1986
1986 establishments in France
1987 disestablishments in France